Haematoxylum is a genus of flowering plants in the legume family, Fabaceae, subfamily Caesalpinioideae and the tribe Caesalpinieae.

Species
Haematoxylum comprises the following species:
 Haematoxylum brasiletto H.Karst.—Palo Brasil, Brazilette, Peachwood (Mexico, Central America, Colombia)
 Haematoxylum calakmulense Cruz Durán & M. Sousa
 Haematoxylum campechianum L.—Logwood (Southern Mexico, Northern Central America)
 Haematoxylum dinteri Harms
 Haematoxylum sousanum Cruz Durán & J. Jiménez Ram.

References

External links

Caesalpinieae
Fabaceae genera